Kitić (Serbian Cyrillic Китић) is a Serbian and Bosnian family name

Mile Kitić (1952), Serbian folk singer
Aleksandar Kitić (1983), Bosnian footballer
Svetlana Dašić-Kitić (1960) Bosnian handball player
Milena Kitić, Serbia-born, naturalized American opera singer

Serbian surnames